There are many works relating to Joseph Smith. These works cover Joseph Smith's his life, legacy, and teachings. Smith is the author of several works of scripture, and several personal histories, letters, and other writings. There have also been several biographies written about him.

Works accepted by Latter Day Saints as Scripture

 
 Compiled extracts from prior church publications, including the Book of Moses, the Book of Abraham, Joseph Smith–Matthew, Joseph Smith–History, and the Articles of Faith.

Teachings and writings
 
 

 (10 volumes as of 2014, publication ongoing)

Biographies

Other historical works

Films
American Prophet: The Story of Joseph Smith (1999), broadcast on PBS and produced by Vermont Public Television
The Joseph Smith Papers: Television Documentary Series (2008-09), produced by Larry H. Miller for KJZZ-TV
Joseph Smith: The Prophet of the Restoration. (2005), produced by the Church of Jesus Christ of Latter-day Saints
Joseph Smith - Volume 1: Plates of Gold (2011) – LDS cinema film, produced by Christian Vuissa
The Work and the Glory (2004), film directed by Russell Holt
The Work and the Glory: American Zion (2005), film directed by Sterling Van Wagenen
The Work and The Glory: A House Divided  (2006), film directed by Sterling Van Wagenen

Fiction

Notes

History books about the Latter Day Saint movement

Latter Day Saint culture